Tekija is a village in the Ilinden Municipality of North Macedonia.

Demographics
On the 1927 ethnic map of Leonhard Schulze-Jena, the village is written as "Tečija" and shown as a Turkish village. According to the 2002 census, the village had a total of 304 inhabitants. Ethnic groups in the village include:

Macedonians 293
Serbs 5
Others 6

References

Villages in Ilinden Municipality